This is a list of diplomatic missions of São Tomé and Príncipe, excluding honorary consulates. São Tomé and Príncipe is a small Portuguese-speaking island country in the Gulf of Guinea, Central Africa. It has a very small number of diplomatic missions.

Africa

 Luanda (Embassy)

 Praia (Embassy)

 Malabo (Embassy)

 Libreville (Embassy)

 Abuja (Embassy)

Asia

 Beijing (Embassy)

Europe

 Brussels (Embassy)

 Lisbon (Embassy)

Multilateral organisations

Addis Ababa (Mission to the African Union)

Brussels (Mission to the European Union)
 CPLP
Lisbon (Mission to the Community of Portuguese Language Countries)

New York (Permanent Mission to the United Nations)

Gallery

See also
 Foreign relations of São Tomé and Príncipe
 List of diplomatic missions in São Tomé and Príncipe
 Visa policy of São Tomé and Príncipe

References
São Toméan Honorary Consulate in Marseille, France (French)
São Toméan Consulate in Atlanta, USA

Foreign relations of São Tomé and Príncipe
Sao Tome and Principe
Diplomatic missions